The following lists events that happened during the 1790s in South Africa.

Events

1790
 More Xhosa clans started crossing the Great Fish Riverin search of better grazing

1791
 29 June – Johan Isaac Rhenius is appointed acting Governor of the Cape Colony

1792
 A Dutch Reformed Church is founded in Graaff Reinet
 A Moravian Mission is founded at Genadendal
 23 June – Sebastiaan Cornelis Nederburgh and Simon Hendrik Frijkenius, both Commissioner-Generals of the Dutch East India Company arrive in the Cape to settle disputes between the free citizens and the company.
 3 July – Sebastiaan Nederburgh is appointed Commissioner-general of the Cape

1793
 Xhosas clash with the white settlers at the Fish River starting full out war, 2nd Cape Frontier War
 War is declared by the victorious French revolutionaries against the Dutch Prince of Orange
 Britain goes to war against France
 2 September – Abraham Josias Sluysken is appointed the Governor of the Cape. He is the last governor under Dutch East India Company rule
 8 October – After a series of victories, the Dutch commandoes led by Landdrost Honoratus CD Maynier, could not force the Xhosa over the Fish River and peace was accepted and thereby ending the 2nd Cape Frontier War.

1795
 The Dutch East India Company is in financial ruins
 29 January – Farmers expelled the officials of the Dutch East India Company and established an independent government at Graaff Reinet
 18 June Swellendam follows Graaff Reinet and declares a republic under Hermanus Steyn
 The Netherlands is invaded by the French under the leadership of Napoléon Bonaparte
 A republic is declared by Dutch revolutionaries and the Prince of Orange flees to England
 16 September – British forces under General Sir James Henry Craig seizes the Cape Colony for the Stadtholder Prince William V of Orange
 The republics of Graaff Reinet and Swellendam reject the British and the British army is sent in
 The start of free trade was announced

1797
 5 March – The Cape becomes a British colony
 4 May – Sir John Barrow, author and explorer, arrives at the Cape Colony
 23 May – The first British Governor of the Cape Colony, Lord Macartney, arrives.

1798
 The first Post Office is established in the Cape Colony
 The Dutch East India Company is liquidated
 The first mosque in southern Africa is established in Dorp Street by Tuan Guru
 A Dutch Reformed Church is founded at Swellendam
 22 November Dundas is appointed Governor of the Cape

1799
 Farmers of Graaff Reinet revolt against the British
 The 3rd Cape Frontier War starts between white settlers and the Xhosas and only ends in 1801
 The British build Fort Frederick in Algoa Bay
 The eastern cape Khoikhoi revolt
 The London Missionary Society set up their first station at Zak River
 First recorded landing on the Prince Edward Islands by French sealers 
 5 November – HMS Sceptre, wrecking, Table Bay
 18 December – Sir George Young is appointed Governor of the Cape

Births
 19 December 1792 – Hendrik Potgieter, Voortrekker leader, is born in Graaff-Reinet, Cape Colony
 1 March 1797 – Gerhardus Marthinus Maritz, Voortrekker leader, is born in the Graaff-Reinet District
 21 June 1797 – Christoffel Brand, politician, (d. 1875)
 27 November 1798 – Andries Pretorius, Voortrekker leader, is born in Graaff-Reinet, Cape Colony

Deaths
 1793 – Baron Joachim van Plettenberg, Governor of the Cape Colony, dies

References

See Years in South Africa for list of other References

History of South Africa